Douglas West railway station served the village of Douglas West, South Lanarkshire in Scotland between 1896 and 1964.

History

The station at Douglas West was opened on 1 October 1896 by the Caledonian Railway, which had absorbed the Lanark Railway, the Lesmahagow Railway and the M&LJR. It was situated to the south-west of Poneil Junction, where the former Lanark Railway line was met by the former M&LJR line. There were two platforms connected by a footbridge; close to the southbound platform was a signal box and behind that a goods shed.

Passenger services over the former M&LJR line were withdrawn on 11 September 1939.

The station was closed by British Railways on 5 October 1964.

References

External links
Douglas West Station on navigable O.S. map

Disused railway stations in South Lanarkshire
Former Caledonian Railway stations
Railway stations in Great Britain opened in 1896
Railway stations in Great Britain closed in 1964
Beeching closures in Scotland